The prime minister of Singapore is the head of government of the Republic of Singapore. The president appoints the prime minister, a Member of Parliament (MP) who in their opinion, is most likely to command the confidence of the majority of MPs. The incumbent prime minister is Lee Hsien Loong, who took office on 12 August 2004.

Singapore is modelled after the Westminster system. The prime minister only governs with the confidence of the majority in Parliament; as such, the prime minister typically sits as a Member of Parliament (MP) and leads the largest party or a coalition of parties. In practice, the prime minister is the leader of the political party with the majority number of elected MPs.

History
The office of Prime Minister succeeded the office of Chief Minister in 1959 after Singapore had attained self-governance from the United Kingdom, as the State of Singapore, with Lee Kuan Yew being sworn in as the first prime minister on 5 June 1959. 

With respect to Singapore's autonomous status in the Malaysia Agreement, the title of prime minister remained unchanged after Singapore's merger with Malaya, Sarawak and North Borneo to form Malaysia in 1963, despite the existence of the prime minister of Malaysia for the entire federation of which Singapore was briefly a part of.

Following the independence of Singapore in 1965, the office of Prime Minister was retained, with the president of Singapore becoming a ceremonial head of state. In 1991, amendments to the Constitution of Singapore vested executive powers in the presidency, along with discretionary veto powers over the government. The Constitution also vests "general direction and control of the government" in the Cabinet, with the president almost always bound to act on the advice of the Cabinet or any minister acting under the Cabinet authority. Thus, in practice, most of the actual work of governing is done by the prime minister and Cabinet.

Under Article 26(4)(a) of the Constitution of Singapore, the prime minister may appoint a Cabinet minister, subject to presidential approval, as acting prime minister if the prime minister is on medical leave, away from Singapore or is granted a leave of absence under Article 32 of the Constitution. The deputy prime minister or senior minister will usually become the acting prime minister, but any Cabinet minister may be appointed to the role.

Authority
Under the Constitution, executive power is nominally vested in the president. However, the president can only exercise that authority on the advice of the Cabinet or a minister acting under general Cabinet authority. Hence, in practice the prime minister, as the Cabinet's leader, does most of the actual work of governing.

The prime minister is responsible for overseeing the overall day-to-day affairs of the government and executing government policy. As leader of the majority party in Parliament, the prime minister is responsible for passing legislation through Parliament. 

The prime minister also nominates the speaker of Parliament and leader of the house, who are responsible for arranging government business and organising legislative programmes, usually under the directive of the prime minister and the Cabinet.

The prime minister chooses the other members of the Cabinet by advising the president; the president must exercise their powers in accordance with the advice of the prime minister. The prime minister may change, retain, or revoke any sitting minister's appointment under their prerogative. The prime minister also advises the president on appointments, such as Attorney-General, and Permanent Secretary of a ministry.

The prime minister can advise the president for a Proclamation of Emergency; the president issues the proclamation if satisfied. 

The prime minister can declare a defence or security measure, and has executive authority over the Singapore Armed Forces (SAF) through the Armed Forces Council, which consists of Minister for Defence, Permanent Secretaries of the Ministry of Defence (MINDEF), Chief of Defence Force, Chief of Army, Chief of Air Force and Chief of Navy; all of whom are appointed by the president under the prime minister's advice.

Privileges

Sri Temasek is the official residence of the prime minister, though none of the prime ministers have ever lived there. The Istana is the working office of the prime minister. 

The prime minister is protected by the Specialised Security Command of the Singapore Police Force (SPF), who also ensure the protection of the president, Cabinet ministers, and visiting foreign dignitaries.

As there is no one to decide on the annual performance bonus for the prime minister, the prime minister's bonus will be based only on the National Bonus. The prime minister is also on the Medisave-cum-Subsidised Outpatient (MSO) scheme—where an additional 2% of their gross monthly salary will be credited into their Medisave account. 

The prime minister's annual salary was  prior to a salary review in 2011. On 21 May 2011, a committee was set by Prime Minister Lee Hsien Loong, to review the salaries of the prime minister as well as the president, ministers, members of Parliament and other political officeholders.

Nonetheless, the prime minister of Singapore remains the highest-paid political leader in the world.

List of prime ministers 

 Political parties

See also
 Prime Minister's Office (PMO)
 Cabinet of Singapore
 Leader of the Opposition
 Politics of Singapore

References

External links

 Prime Minister's Office

Lists of political office-holders in Singapore
Singapore
 
1959 establishments in Singapore